Carpophilus antiquus is a species of sap-feeding beetle in the family Nitidulidae. It is found in North America.

Carpophilus antiquus can synthesize a novel pheromone while feeding on wheat, yeast, or corn that attracts the same and sympatric species and lead to a beetle infestation.

References

Further reading

 

Nitidulidae
Articles created by Qbugbot
Beetles described in 1844